Novosemyonovka is a rural locality (a village) in Denisovskoye Rural Settlement, Gorokhovetsky District, Vladimir Oblast, Russia. The population was 11 as of 2010.

Geography 
Novosemyonovka is located 32 km southwest of Gorokhovets (the district's administrative centre) by road. Dubovo is the nearest rural locality.

References 

Rural localities in Gorokhovetsky District